Birte Weiß  (born 5 June 1971) is a German footballer who played for the Germany women's national football team from 1991 to 1993, competing in two matches. On club level she played for Wismut Aue and VfR Eintracht Wolfsburg.

References

External links
 Profile at soccerdonna.de

1971 births
Living people
German women's footballers
Place of birth missing (living people)
Germany women's international footballers
Women's association football forwards
East German women's footballers